Kahtu (also Romanized as Kahtū; also known as Kahtūyeh) is a village in Meshkan Rural District, Poshtkuh District, Neyriz County, Fars Province, Iran. At the 2006 census, its population was 35, in 20 families.

References 

Populated places in Neyriz County